Ulyagir is a rural locality (a settlement) in Rabochy Posyolok Urusha of Skovorodinsky District, Amur Oblast, Russia. The population was 2 as of 2018.

Geography 
Ulyagir is located 63 km west of Skovorodino (the district's administrative centre) by road. Madalan is the nearest rural locality.

References 

Rural localities in Skovorodinsky District